Quilenda is a town and municipality in Cuanza Sul Province in Angola. The municipality had a population of 97,648 in 2014.

References

Populated places in Cuanza Sul Province
Municipalities of Angola